Max Gordon may refer to:

Max Gordon (Village Vanguard founder), founder of the Village Vanguard jazz club
Max Gordon (producer), New York theatre and film producer
Max Gordon (racing driver) (born 2008), American racing driver
Max Gordon (trade unionist) (1910–1977), South African trade union leader and Trotskyist activist